Chrystiane Lopes (born 26 July 1993), known as Chrysti Ane, is a Brazilian actress who works in television. She played the role of Kayla in A Housekeeper's Revenge. She best known for playing the role of Sarah Thompson/Pink Ninja Steel Ranger in Power Rangers Ninja Steel.

Personal life
In September 2018, she and her boyfriend, American actor Ryan Guzman, announced that they were expecting their first child, within days revealed to be a boy. She gave birth to their son in January 2019. On January 7, 2021 the couple welcomed their second child, a daughter.

Filmography

References

External links 
 
 

1993 births
Living people
Actresses from Rio de Janeiro (city)
American people of Brazilian descent
Brazilian expatriates in the United States
Brazilian female models
Brazilian film actresses
Brazilian television actresses
21st-century Brazilian actresses